2009–10 Serie A is the 62nd Serie A season in Unione Calcio Sampdoria's history. Sampdoria also participated in 2009–10 Coppa Italia, starting from the 3rd round. Sampdoria finished the 2008–09 Serie A season in 13th place, so they failed to qualify for any of the European competitions for the 2009–10 season. On 16 May 2010, Sampdoria finished their great season with a 1–0 win against S.S.C. Napoli, securing 4th place in 2009–10 Serie A and the final 2010–11 UEFA Champions League qualification spot.

First-team squad
Squad at end of season

Left club during season

List of transfers in 2009–10 

Players in

Players out

Competitions

Serie A

League table

Fixtures

Catania-Sampdoria 1–2
 0–1 Giampaolo Pazzini (9)
 1–1 Takayuki Morimoto (38)
 1–2 Daniele Gastaldello (90 + 3)

Sampdoria-Udinese 3–1
 1–0 Giampaolo Pazzini (11)
 2–0 Daniele Mannini (45 + 1)
 2–1 Antonio Di Natale (56)
 3–1 Antonio Cassano (83)

Atalanta-Sampdoria 0–1
 0–1 Daniele Mannini (63)

Sampdoria-Siena 4–1
 1–0 Angelo Palombo (23)
 2–0 Daniele Mannini (31)
 3–0 Marco Padalino (48)
 3–1 Michele Fini (68)
 4–1 Marco Padalino (85)

Fiorentina-Sampdoria 2–0
 1–0 Stevan Jovetić (25)
 2–0 Alberto Gilardino (66)

Sampdoria-Inter 1–0
 1–0 Giampaolo Pazzini (72)

Sampdoria-Parma 1–1
 1–0 Giampaolo Pazzini (23)
 1–1 Daniele Galloppa (30)

Lazio-Sampdoria 1–1
 0–1 Giampaolo Pazzini (40)
 1–1 Matuzalém (42)

Sampdoria-Bologna 4–1
 1–0 Giampaolo Pazzini (8)
 2–0 Daniele Mannini (17)
 3–0 Reto Ziegler (26)
 4–0 Daniele Mannini (33)
 4–1 Pablo Daniel Osvaldo (62)

Juventus-Sampdoria 5–1
 1–0 Amauri (26)
 2–0 Giorgio Chiellini (42)
 3–0 Mauro Camoranesi (50)
 4–0 Amauri (62)
 4–1 Giampaolo Pazzini (63)
 5–1 David Trezeguet (88)

Sampdoria-Bari 0–0

Cagliari-Sampdoria 2–0
 1–0 Daniele Conti (85)
 2–0 Alessandro Matri (89)

Sampdoria-Chievo 2–1
 1–0 Marco Rossi (19)
 2–0 Giampaolo Pazzini (65)
 2–1 Andrea Mantovani (80)

Genoa-Sampdoria 3–0
 1–0 Omar Milanetto (10 pen)
 2–0 Marco Rossi (53)
 3–0 Raffaele Palladino (75)

Milan-Sampdoria 3–0
 1–0 Marco Borriello (2)
 2–0 Clarence Seedorf (21)
 3–0 Pato (23)

Sampdoria-Roma 0–0

Livorno-Sampdoria 3–1
 0–1 Antonio Cassano (15)
 1–1 Nelson Rivas (37)
 2–1 Tomas Danilevicius (47)
 3–1 Tomas Danilevicius (90 + 3)

Sampdoria-Palermo 1–1
 0–1 Edinson Cavani (40)
 1–1 Antonio Cassano (41)

Napoli-Sampdoria 1–0
 1–0 Germán Denis (71)

Sampdoria-Catania 1–1
 0–1 Cristian Llama (14)
 1–1 Giampaolo Pazzini (45 pen)

Udinese-Sampdoria 2–3
 1–0 Antonio Di Natale (7 pen)
 1–1 Giampaolo Pazzini (27 pen)
 2–1 Mauricio Isla (44)
 2–2 Nicola Pozzi (57)
 2–3 Franco Semioli (66)

Sampdoria-Atalanta 2–0
 1–0 Angelo Palombo (36)
 2–0 Giampaolo Pazzini (45 + 1)

Siena-Sampdoria 1–2
 0–1 Daniele Gastaldello (3)
 0–2 Nicola Pozzi (77)
 1–2 Massimo Maccarone (82)

Sampdoria-Fiorentina 2–0
 1–0 Franco Semioli (16)
 2–0 Giampaolo Pazzini (40)

Inter-Sampdoria 0–0

Parma-Sampdoria 1–0
 1–0 Cristian Zaccardo (54)

Sampdoria-Lazio 2–1
 0–1 Sergio Floccari (7)
 1–1 Stefano Guberti (29)
 2–1 Giampaolo Pazzini (36)

Bologna-Sampdoria 1–1
 0–1 Daniele Gastaldello (86)
 1–1 Andrea Raggi (90 + 2)

Sampdoria-Juventus 1–0
 1–0 Antonio Cassano (76)

Bari-Sampdoria 2–1
 0–1 Antonio Cassano (19)
 1–1 Riccardo Meggiorini (58)
 2–1 Barreto (86)

Sampdoria-Cagliari 1–1
 1–0 Stefano Guberti (46)
 1–1 Nenê (81)

Chievo-Sampdoria 1–2
 0–1 Antonio Cassano (1)
 0–2 Giampaolo Pazzini (55)
 1–2 Andrea Mantovani (76)

Sampdoria-Genoa 1–0
 1–0 Antonio Cassano (23)

Sampdoria-Milan 2–1
 0–1 Marco Borriello (20)
 1–1 Antonio Cassano (54 pen)
 2–1 Giampaolo Pazzini (90 + 2)

Roma-Sampdoria 1–2
 1–0 Francesco Totti (14)
 1–1 Giampaolo Pazzini (52)
 1–2 Giampaolo Pazzini (85)

Sampdoria-Livorno 2–0
 1–0 Antonio Cassano (5)
 2–0 Reto Ziegler (84)

Palermo-Sampdoria 1–1
 0–1 Giampaolo Pazzini (51 pen)
 1–1 Fabrizio Miccoli (68 pen)

Sampdoria-Napoli 1–0
 1–0 Giampaolo Pazzini (51)

Summary

Coppa Italia

Starting 11

Squad statistics 

Last update 17 May 2010'

Goalscorers 
Source:

References 

U.C. Sampdoria seasons
Sampdoria